Sir Charles Fitzpatrick   (December 19, 1851 – June 17, 1942) was a Canadian lawyer and politician, who served as the fifth Chief Justice of Canada. He was born in Quebec City, Canada East, to John Fitzpatrick and Mary Connolly.

He studied at Laval University, earning his B.A. degree (1873) and LL.B degree (1876), earning the Dufferin Silver Medal. Called to the bar of Quebec in 1876, he established his practice in Quebec City and later founded the law firm of Fitzpatrick & Taschereau.

In 1885, he acted as chief counsel to Louis Riel who was on trial for leading the North-West Rebellion. Riel was found guilty and sentenced to death.

Fitzpatrick entered politics in 1890, winning election to the Quebec Legislative Assembly in Québec-Comté electoral district.  He was re-elected in 1892, but resigned in June 1896 to enter federal politics.

He was first elected to the House of Commons of Canada in Quebec County electoral district in the 1896 federal election as a Liberal Member of Parliament (MP). He served as Solicitor General of Canada from 1896 to 1902, and as Minister of Justice from 1902 until 1906.

He was appointed to the Supreme Court of Canada as Chief Justice. He served in that position until 1918 when he was appointed the 12th Lieutenant Governor of Quebec. During his period as Lieutenant Governor, his nephew acted as Premier of Quebec, Louis-Alexandre Taschereau.

He is the only Chief Justice other than Sir William Buell Richards to have served in that position without having first been a Puisne Justice on the court (Richards was Chief Justice at the court's creation in 1875), and the only Chief Justice to have been appointed without any prior judicial experience.

In 1905, he took part, as the federal government representative, in the negotiations that led to the creation of the provinces of Alberta and Saskatchewan.  He was knighted in 1907.

May 20, 1879, Fitzpatrick married Marie-Elmire-Corinne Caron, daughter of René-Édouard Caron, 2nd Lieutenant Governor of Quebec, and his wife Marie-Joséphine De Blois.Chief Justice Fitzpatrick died on June 17, 1942, aged 90 years and 6 months; he is interred in Sillery, at Saint-Michel Cemetery (cimetière Saint-Michel de Sillery).

Archives 
There is a Charles Fitzpatrick fonds at Library and Archives Canada.

Electoral record 

By-election: On Mr. Fitzpatrick being appointed Solicitor General, 11 July 1896

References

External links
 
 Supreme Court of Canada Biography
 
 
 
 Fitzpatrick, Sir Charles National Historic Person — Parks Canada
 Hon. Charles Fitzpatrick, B.A.,  — The Newspaper Reference Book of Canada: Embracing Facts and Data Regarding Canada and Biographical Sketches of Representative Canadian Men. Toronto: The Press Publishing Company, Limited (1903), p. 201
 Sir Charles Fitzpatrick, Canadian Confederation — Library and Archives Canada (2005)
 Sir Charles Fitzpatrick — The Canadian Encyclopedia (2013)

1851 births
1942 deaths
Anglophone Quebec people
Canadian Knights Grand Cross of the Order of St Michael and St George
Canadian Roman Catholics
Chief justices of Canada
Lawyers in Quebec
Liberal Party of Canada MPs
Lieutenant Governors of Quebec
Members of the House of Commons of Canada from Quebec
Members of the King's Privy Council for Canada
Members of the Judicial Committee of the Privy Council
Persons of National Historic Significance (Canada)
Politicians from Quebec City
Quebec Liberal Party MNAs
Quebec people of Irish descent
Solicitors General of Canada
Université Laval alumni
Université Laval Faculté de droit alumni
Canadian members of the Privy Council of the United Kingdom
Academic staff of Université Laval